Jill Stockdale (born October 1963) is an English cricketer and former member of the England women's cricket team. She played one Test match, against New Zealand, and two One Day Internationals, against Australia. She played domestic cricket for Yorkshire.

References

External links
 

1963 births
Living people
England women Test cricketers
England women One Day International cricketers
Yorkshire women cricketers